Intrepid Records was a Canadian independent record label founded in Toronto, Ontario.  People associated with the label included founder Stuart Ravenhill and A&R rep Graham Stairs.

Artists who recorded for Intrepid included National Velvet, Rheostatics, Meryn Cadell, The Bookroom, Martha and the Muffins, Rail T.E.C., Squiddly, Stranger Than Fiction, Cottage Industry, and KCC & Dance Speak.

The label was best known, however, for two tribute albums: the 1991 Bruce Cockburn tribute Kick at the Darkness, featuring Barenaked Ladies' version of Cockburn's "Lovers in a Dangerous Time", and the 1992 Joni Mitchell tribute Back to the Garden. The label also released the soundtrack album for Bruce McDonald's film Highway 61.

Intrepid was distributed through Capitol/EMI Canada.

Record labels disestablished in 1993
Canadian independent record labels
Companies based in Toronto
Defunct record labels of Canada